The  is an electric multiple unit (EMU) commuter train type operated by East Japan Railway Company (JR East) in the Tokyo area of Japan since 1993.

The series was introduced in 1992 for experimental operations (as the 901 series) and in 1993 for commercial operations to replace the aging 103 series stock on the Keihin–Tōhoku and Negishi lines. The concept of the 209 series was to create a lower-cost, minimal lifespan train (approximately 15 years) that would be replaced rather than rebuilt when they became life-expired.

Variants
  /  209-500 series: 10-car set used on the Keiyō Line since 2008, and 8-car sets on the Musashino Line since 2010
  209-1000 series: 10-car sets used on the Chūō Line (Rapid) (and occasionally the Ōme Line) since March 2019
  209-2000/2100 series: 6/4-car sets converted from former Keihin–Tōhoku—Negishi Line 209-0 series units, used on Narita Line, Sōbu Main Line, Sotobō Line, Tōgane Line, and Uchibō Line services since 2009
 209-2200 series: 6-car set used from January 2018 as the Boso Bicycle Base
  209-3500 series: 4-car sets converted from former Chūō–Sōbu Line 209-500 series units, used on the Kawagoe Line and Hachikō Line since 2018

Former operations
  /  209-0 series: 10-car sets used on the Keihin–Tōhoku—Negishi Line from 1993 until January 2010, and 6-car sets on the Nambu Line until February 2015
  /  209-500 series: 10-car sets used on the Chūō–Sōbu Line from 1998 until April 2019 and the Keihin–Tōhoku—Negishi Line from 2001 to 2009
  209-900/910/920 series: 10-car prototypes initially classified as 901 series used on the Keihin–Tōhoku—Negishi Line
  209-950 series: 10-car set used on the Chūō–Sōbu Line until it was redesignated as the E231-900 series
  209-1000 series 10-car sets used on the Jōban Line from 1999 until October 2018
  209-2000/2100 series: 4-car sets used on the Kashima Line from 2009 until March 2021
  209-2200 series: 6-car sets used on the Nambu Line from 2009 until March 2017
  209-3000 series: 4-car sets used on the Kawagoe Line and Hachikō Line from March 1996 until February 2019
  209-3100 series: 4-car sets converted from surplus TWR 70-000 series units, used on the Kawagoe Line and Hachikō Line from April 2005 until January 2022

209-0 series

The original full-production version introduced on both the Keihin–Tōhoku—Negishi (78 ten-car sets numbered 1–78) and Nambu (2 six-car sets numbered 1 and 32) lines in 1993. Six-door SaHa 208 cars were inserted into the Keihin–Tōhoku—Negishi Line sets in 1995.

The 209 series trains on the Keihin–Tōhoku—Negishi Line were replaced by new E233-1000 series trains from autumn 2007, with the last sets withdrawn by 24 January 2010. A large number of these units were subsequently rebuilt as 209-2000/2100 series four-car and six-car sets for use in the Chiba area, while some were converted as training sets, MUE-Train, or 209-2200 series sets for the Nambu Line.

Formations

Keihin–Tōhoku—Negishi Line 10-car sets
Previously, 78 ten-car sets (1–78) were based at Urawa depot and were formed as shown below, with four motored ("M") cars and six non-powered trailer ("T") cars.

 Cars 3 and 8 were each equipped with one PS28 pantograph.
 Car 6 was a "6-door" car with six pairs of doors on each side.

Nambu Line 6-car sets
Previously, two six-car sets (1 and 32) were based at Nakahara Depot and were formed as shown below, with four motored ("M") cars and two non-powered trailer ("T") cars.

 Cars 2 and 4 were each equipped with one PS28 lozenge-type pantograph.

209-500 series

This sub-series represented a stop-gap for use from 1998 on the Chūō–Sōbu Line until the full-production E231 series trains were delivered, and a total of 17 ten-car sets (numbered 51–67) were delivered to Narashino Depot in Chiba. While externally similar in appearance to the later E231 series sets, the 209-500 series are distinguishable by their white cab fronts and lack of six-door cars.

In November 2000, two sets (66 and 67) were transferred to the Keihin–Tōhoku—Negishi Line and renumbered 80 and 81. In December 2003, the Chūō–Sōbu Line sets were reallocated to Mitaka Depot and renumbered 501–515. Between 2005 and 2006, set 515 was lent to the Keihin–Tōhoku—Negishi Line as a spare during car maintenance. Between 2006 and 2007, three more sets (513–515) were transferred to the Keihin–Tōhoku—Negishi Line to replace the prototype 209-900/910/920 series trains and renumbered 82–84. From October 2008, following the introduction of E233-1000 series trains on the Keihin–Tōhoku—Negishi Line, one set (80) was transferred back to the Chūō–Sōbu Line (as set 516) while the other four sets (81–84) were modified (with ATS-P/SN instead of ATC) and transferred to the Keiyō Line (as sets 31–34).

From September 2010 to January 2011, three former Keiyō Line sets (31–33) were reduced to eight cars and reliveried for use on the Musashino Line, renumbered M71–M73, and entered service from 4 December 2010. In 2012, a "C" suffix was added to all Chūō–Sōbu Line sets (C501–C512 and C516).

From 2018, five Chūō–Sōbu Line sets (C501–C505) were converted to 4-car 209-3500 series sets for use on Kawagoe Line and Hachikō Line services, while the remaining eight sets (C506–C512 and C516) were reduced to 8 cars and reallocated to the Musashino Line and renumbered M74–M77 and M81–M84. The last Chūō–Sōbu Line set, set C511, was withdrawn from service on 19 April 2019.

All sets were refurbished between 2016 and 2019, when the GTO-VVVF traction system was replaced with an IGBT-VVVF traction system.

Set transfer history 
The following table shows the transfer history for each of the 17 sets.

Formations

10-car sets
, one set (34) is allocated to Keiyō Depot for use on the Keiyō Line (and through services to the Sotobō and Uchibō Lines). The set is formed as follows with four motored ("M") cars and six non-powered trailer ("T") cars.

 Cars 3 and 8 each have one single-arm pantograph.
 Cars 1 and 10 have a wheelchair space.
 Car 4 is designated as a mildly air-conditioned car.

8-car sets
, 11 eight-car sets (M71 to M77, M81 to M84) were allocated to Keiyō Depot for use on Musashino Line (and through services to the Keiyō Line). These sets are formed as follows with four motored ("M") cars and four non-powered trailer ("T") cars.

 Cars 2 and 6 each have one pantograph (single-arm on sets M71–M77, lozenge-type on sets M81– M84).
 Cars 1 and 8 have a wheelchair space.
 Car 4 is designated as a mildly air-conditioned car.

Previous formations

Chūō–Sōbu Line 10-car sets (1998 to 2019)

Keihin–Tōhoku—Negishi Line 10-car sets (2001 to 2009)

209-900/910/920 series

Three ten-car prototypes were built in 1992 for testing and passenger evaluation on the Keihin–Tōhoku—Negishi Line, initially classified as 901 series. Set A was built by Kawasaki Heavy Industries, set B by Tokyu Car Corporation, and set C was built by Kawasaki Heavy Industries and JR East's Ōfuna factory (cars 4 and 5). The three sets incorporated a number of different design features for evaluation, but were converted in 1994 to bring them in line with the full-production specifications. Set A became 209-900 series set 90, set B became 209-910 series set 91, and set C became 209-920 series set 92. They differed from the full-production 209-0 series sets in not having six-door SaHa 208 cars.

209-910 series set 91 was withdrawn in December 2006, and the last of the three prototype sets, set 90, was withdrawn in August 2007. Car KuHa 209-901 from the original 901 series set A was stored at Nagano Works, and later preserved at Tōkyō General Rolling Stock Center.

Formation

209-950 series

This was the original classification given to the prototype E231 series 10-car set delivered in October 1998, to test out the then-new insulated-gate bipolar transistor (IGBT) traction system and TIMS passenger information system. It was reclassified as E231-900 series in June 2000 following conversion to the full-production E231 standard.

209-1000 series

Two 10-car sets (81 and 82) were delivered from Tokyu Car Corporation in August and September 1999, entering service from 4 December 1999 on Jōban Line and Tokyo Metro Chiyoda Line inter-running services. Based on the 209-0 series, these trains have end doors for use in emergencies inside tunnels. These sets were based at JR East's Matsudo depot. These train sets have since been withdrawn from the Jōban Line in October 2018 and reallocated to the Chūō Line (Rapid) in December 2018, being based at JR East's Toyoda Depot after the reallocation. Operations officially started on the Chūō Line in March 2019.

While these sets usually operate only between Tokyo and Takao, on rare occasions (such as a shortage of train sets due to an accident) they may operate as far as Ōtsuki, or on the Ōme Line as far as Ōme. Furthermore, unlike the E233 series in use, due to the lack of passenger-operated door controls, all doors open on these sets while in use on the Ōme Line.

Formation
As of 1 January 2020, two 10-car sets (81–82) are allocated to Toyoda Depot and are formed as follows with six motored ("M") cars and four non-powered trailer ("T") cars.

 Cars 2, 5 and 8 each have one single-arm pantograph.
 Cars 2 and 9 have wheelchair space.
 Car 4 is designated as a mildly air-conditioned car.

Previous formation

10-car Jōban Line sets (1999 to 2018)

 Cars 3, 6 and 9 were originally fitted with PS21 lozenge type pantographs, but were converted to single-arm models in 2014.
 Cars 2 and 9 had wheelchair space.
 Car 4 was designated as a mildly air-conditioned car.

Interior

209-2000/2100 series

These are four- and six-car sets based at Makuhari Depot modified between 2009 and 2013 from former Keihin–Tōhoku—Negishi Line 209-0 series ten-car sets for use on Chiba area and Bōsō Peninsula local services from 1 October 2009 to replace ageing 211 series trains. Modifications include new electrical equipment, the addition of transverse seating to end cars, LED destination indicator panels, and a toilet. The cars are numbered in the -2100 series, although nine four-car sets have end cars numbered in the -2000 series. The -2000 series cars are converted from early batch 209-0 series units with air-operated doors rather than the electrically operated doors of later batch units.

The first four-car set (C417) was outshopped from Nagano Works in June 2009, while the first six-car set (C602) was outshopped from Ōmiya Works in July 2009. The entire conversion process was completed in 2013, and a total of 42 four-car sets (C401–C442) and 26 six-car sets (C601–C626) were formed.

From 13 March 2021, they were replaced on rural services with new E131 series trains. Six 6-car sets were shortened to 4-car sets between February to March 2021; the two surplus cars from each set along with three others 6-car sets (C612, C618, C626) were scrapped between April and May 2021.

In July 2021, 6-car set C609 was removed from JR service and delivered to Izukyū Corporation, and four cars from set C601 were delivered in November 2021. They are expected to enter service in Spring 2022 as the Izukyu 3000 series.

The table below shows the converted sets.

Formations

6-car sets
As of 22 December 2021, 14 six-car sets (C602–C604, C606–C608, C610, C615, C617, C621–C625) are based at Makuhari Depot and were formed as shown below, with four motored ("M") cars and two non-powered trailer ("T") cars.

 Cars 3 and 5 are each equipped with one lozenge-type pantograph.

4-car sets
As of 24 March 2021, 48 four-car sets (C401–C448) are based at Makuhari Depot and were formed as shown below, with two motored ("M") cars and two non-powered trailer ("T") cars.

 Car 3 is equipped with one lozenge-type pantograph.

Interior
Passenger accommodation consists primarily of longitudinal seating, with the end cars featuring some transverse seating bays. Car 2 is fitted with a toilet in all sets.

209-2200 series

Between 2009 and 2010, three six-car sets were reformed from former Keihin–Tōhoku—Negishi Line 209-0 series ten-car sets for use on Nambu Line services, replacing the early-batch 209-0 series set and a 205-1200 series set. The first set, number 52, was outshopped in May 2009, and entered service on 12 June 2009. Modifications include new electrical equipment and the addition of LED destination indicator panels.

Two sets (52 and 54) were removed from service and replaced by new E233-8000 series trains in 2015. These two sets were scrapped.

The last remaining Nambu Line 209-2200 series trainset, set 53, was removed from services from 15 March 2017, being replaced by an E233-8500 series set. Branded "B.B.Base" (an abbreviation for "Boso Bicycle Base"), it re-entered service on 6 January 2018.

Formation

B.B.Base 6-car set
One six-car set (J1) is based at Makuhari Depot and is formed as shown below, with four motored ("M") cars and two non-powered trailer ("T") cars.

 Cars 3 and 5 each have one PS33F single-arm pantograph.
 Cars 1 to 3 and 5 to 6 have fixed seating bays arranged 2+1 abreast with cycle racks provided next to each of the doorways, while car 4 has an open configuration with bench seating on one side and a bar counter.
 Wheelchair-accessible toilets are provided in cars 2 and 4.

Previous formations

Nambu Line 6-car sets
Previously, three six-car sets (52–54) were based at Nakahara Depot and were formed as shown below, with four motored ("M") cars and two non-powered trailer ("T") cars.

 Cars 2 and 4 were each equipped with one PS28A lozenge-type pantograph.

209-3000 series

Four four-car 6th-batch sets were introduced on 16 March 1996 for use on the Kawagoe Line and newly electrified southern section of the Hachikō Line. These sets (numbers 61 to 64) were based at JR East's Kawagoe depot. While visually similar to the original 209-0 sub-series, these sets differ in having passenger-operated door controls.

These sets were displaced by newly refurbished E231-3000 series and 209-3500 series sets entering service from 2017 and 2018, with the last set withdrawn in February 2019. In late 2018, two cars of set 62 were formed into a training unit and the other two cars were scrapped; the remaining three sets were scrapped in early 2020.

Interior 
For a short period in 2004, KuHa 209-3003 of set 63 was fitted with transverse seating bays to increase seating capacity. It was later reverted to standard longitudinal bench seating.

Between February and March 2007, some of the previously sealed windows in each car were modified to allow them to be opened.

Formation (former Hachikō and Kawagoe Line sets)
The four four-car sets were based at Kawagoe depot in Saitama and formed as shown below with two motored ("M") cars and two non-powered trailer ("T") cars.

 Car 3 is fitted with one PS28 lozenge-type pantograph.

Build details

209-3100 series

This sub-series of two four-car sets was introduced on 17 April 2005 as part of the scheme to eliminate 103 series sets from the Kawagoe Line and the Hachikō Line. Set number 71 consists of two former Tokyo Waterfront Railway 70-000 series control cars with two newly manufactured intermediate cars, while set number 72 consists entirely of former 70-000 series cars. The 70-000 series cars had become surplus when six-car sets were reformed into ten-car sets in 2004. Like the 209-3000 series, these sets have passenger-operated door controls.

After being displaced by the 209-3500 and E231-3000 series sets, these sets were taken out of service in October 2019. However, they re-entered service and served as additional trains as the 209-3500 and E231-3000 series sets were modified for wanman driver-only operations. They were removed from service in January 2022 after a special retirement tour event; the sets were then officially retired on 11 March 2022.

Formation
The two four-car sets were based at Kawagoe depot in Saitama and formed as shown below with two motored ("M") cars and two non-powered trailer ("T") cars.

 Car 3 is fitted with one PS28 lozenge-type pantograph.

Former TWR 70-000 series conversions

The identities of the six former 70-000 series cars converted in 2004 and 2005 to become 209-3100 series EMUs are as shown below.

209-3500 series

From 2018, five former 209-500 series ten-car sets based at Mitaka Depot for use on Chūō–Sōbu Line services were reformed and converted to become four-car 209-3500 series sets based at Kawagoe for use on Kawagoe Line and Hachikō Line services.

Between November 2020 and October 2021, the trains were modified for driver-only operation.

Formation

Former set/car identities
The former identities of the 209-3500 series sets are as follows.

Training sets

In 2008, three motored pairs from former Keihin–Tōhoku—Negishi Line 209-0 series sets (MoHa 209-39/208-39 and MoHa 209-40/208-40 from set Ura 19, and MoHa 209-76/208-76 from set Ura 37) were fitted with driving cabs and converted into training sets. These sets were assigned to Yokohama, Hachiōji, and Ōmiya Training Centers. In 2018, one motored pair from a former Kawagoe/Hachikō Line 209-3000 series set (MoHa 209-3002/208-3002 from set Hae 62) was also fitted with driving cabs and converted into a training set. The existing three training sets were subsequently refurbished and reallocated.

Yokohama
From 2008, a training set consisting of KuMoHa 209-39/208-39 is allocated to Yokohama Training Center near Kurihama Station. The set is finished with pale yellow body stripes and bears the text "YOKOHAMA Training Center". It replaced the existing 105 series two-car training set located there.

Ōmiya
From 2018, a training set consisting of KuMoHa 209-3002/208-3002 is allocated to Ōmiya Training Center. The set is finished with Shōnan green/orange body stripes and bears the text "TOKYO•OMIYA Training Center".

Between 2008 and 2018, set KuMoHa 209-76/208-76 was allocated to Ōmiya. This replaced the existing 103 series two-car training set located there.

Hachiōji
From 2019, a training set consisting of KuMoHa 209-76/208-76 is allocated to Hachiōji Training Center near Shin-Akitsu Station. The set is finished with orange body stripes and bears the text "HACHIOJI Training Center".

Between 2008 and 2019, set KuMoHa 209-40/208-40 was allocated to Hachiōji. This replaced the existing 105 series two-car training set located there.

Nagano
From 2019, a training set consisting of KuMoHa 209-40/208-40 is allocated to Nagano Training Center. The set is finished in with Nagano blue body stripes and bears the text "NAGANO Training Center". It replaced the existing 115 series two-car training set located there.

Shirakawa E991 series
 
A purpose-built four-car set based directly on the 209-0 series design and classified E991 series was delivered to JR East's training center in Shirakawa, Fukushima in 2000 for internal training use. Externally, it is finished with green body stripes on unpainted stainless steel. It is not considered a 209 series variant. It cannot run on its own power and must be towed by a locomotive.

MUE-Train

In October 2008, JR East unveiled the seven-car "MUE-Train" (MUltipurpose Experimental Train) experimental EMU converted from former Keihin–Tōhoku—Negishi Line 209 series set Ura 2. This set is used to test and develop new technology for use on future narrow-gauge trains. The train is based at Kawagoe Depot and began testing on the Utsunomiya Line from November 2008.

Formation

2008–2009

2010 onward

Cars 3 and 6 are each fitted with one PS33D single-arm pantograph.

Accidents
On 8 May 2020, at 3:55 pm, the front carriage of a local service (6-car set C612) derailed between Awa-Kamogawa and Awa-Amatsu stations. Around 20 passengers and crew were on board the train when it derailed. One person was taken to a hospital.

Preserved examples

 KuHa 901-1 (previously KuHa 209-901), at the Tokyo General Rolling Stock Center in Shinagawa.

See also
 E231 series, successor
 TWR 70-000 series, a 209 series derivative

References

Further reading

External links

 JR 209 series 

Electric multiple units of Japan
East Japan Railway Company
Train-related introductions in 1993
Kawasaki multiple units
1500 V DC multiple units of Japan
Tokyu Car multiple units